Adam Brown may refer to:

Politics
Adam M. Brown (1826–1901), American politician
Adam Brown (Canadian politician) (1826–1926), Canadian politician and merchant
Adam Brown (Illinois politician) (born 1986), Republican member of the Illinois General Assembly

Sports
Adam Brown (ice hockey) (1920–1960), Canadian ice hockey player
Adam Brown (rugby union) (born 1987), Welsh rugby player
Adam Brown (swimmer) (born 1989), British freestyle swimmer
Adam Brown (footballer) (born 1995), Scottish footballer for St. Mirren

Other
Adam Brown (actor) (born 1980), English actor, comedian and pantomime performer
Adam Brown (music educator) (born 1981), American music educator
Adam Brown (shipwright), American shipbuilder
J. Adam Brown (born 1983), Canadian actor

See also
Adam Brown Crosby (1856–1921), Canadian politician
Adam Brown Littlepage (1859–1921), American lawyer and politician
Adam Browne (born 1963), Australian speculative fiction writer
Sir Adam Browne, 2nd Baronet (c. 1626–1690), English politician